Sir Geoffrey Le Mesurier Mander (6 March 1882 – 9 September 1962) was a Midland industrialist and chairman of Mander Brothers Ltd., paint and varnish manufacturers in Wolverhampton, England, an art collector and Liberal parliamentarian.

Early career 
He was the oldest son of (Samuel) Theodore Mander (of a cadet branch of the prominent Mander family of Midland industrialists and public servants) and his wife, Flora St Clair Paint. Mander's younger brother was actor, playwright and film director Miles Mander. He was educated at Harrow and Trinity College, Cambridge, served in the Royal Flying Corps in World War I, and was called to the bar at the Inner Temple (1921).

Politician 
He entered the House of Commons as the Liberal Party Member of Parliament (MP) for Wolverhampton East at the general election in May 1929.  He was a Liberal specialist on foreign policy between the wars, and was one of the first to take a strong stand against Appeasement of the fascist dictators, and was a crusader on behalf of the League of Nations. During World War II, he was Parliamentary Private Secretary to Sir Archibald Sinclair (later, first Viscount Thurso), the Secretary of State for Air.  He won a reputation in Parliament for his determined use of parliamentary questions. For example, just over a month after the formal establishment of the Peace Pledge Union on 22 May 1936, he asked the first of numerous hostile questions about it on 25 June 1936.

Wolverhampton East was one of the last urban constituencies which the Liberals managed to hold against both Labour Party and Conservative Party opposition up to 1945.  Mander was expected to be nominated Chief Whip for the Liberal Party in the House of Commons, but he lost his seat at the 1945 general election, in the post-war Labour landslide. Considering that Labour had now replaced the Liberals as the main representative of the radical tradition in British politics, he joined the Labour party in 1948, and subsequently served as a Labour member of the Staffordshire County Council.

Among many public offices, he was High Sheriff of Staffordshire (1921), a county councillor, justice of the peace, and was made a Knight Bachelor for public services in the 1945 New Year Honours shortly before his enforced retirement from Parliament.

Industrialist 
He was chairman of Mander Brothers (established in 1773) for a generation, one of the principal local employers and a major manufacturer of paints, inks and varnishes in the British Empire. As an industrialist, he led many progressive initiatives in the field of labour relations and employment welfare between the Wars. Under his direction, Mander Brothers was the first British company to introduce the 40-hour week through an historic agreement signed and mediated by Ernest Bevin, general secretary of the Transport and General Workers' Union, in September 1931.

Art patron 
He was an early conservationist. He offered to buy for the nation William Morris's Red House in London, if a suitable tenant could be found. He did present the family house, Wightwick Manor, in Staffordshire, with its outstanding collections of Victorian art and objects associated with William Morris, the Pre-Raphaelite Brotherhood and the Arts and Crafts movement to the National Trust in 1937. It was the first country house to be so presented during the lifetime of its donor.
 
His second wife, Rosalie Glynn Grylls, was a biographer with an interest in the writers and artists of the Romantic period and an early connoisseur of the Pre-Raphaelite movement. Her biographical subjects included Mary Shelley (1938), Claire Clairmont (1939), Edward John Trelawny (1950), William Godwin (1953), Dante Gabriel Rossetti (1964), Ivy Compton-Burnett (1971) and Elizabeth Barrett Browning (1980). Together Geoffrey and Rosalie Mander were influential in the overdue reassessment of the artists and writers of the Victorian period.

Personal life
Mander was married twice. His first marriage was to Rosalind Florence Caverhill. They had three children:
 Mervyn Caverhill Mander
 Mavis Flora Rosalind Mander
 Elizabeth Brehaut Mander

His second marriage was to Mary Rosalie Glynn Grylls. Their wedding took place in the House of Commons, where Liberal MP Edgar Granville served as best man. The couple had two children:
 John Geoffrey Grylls Mander (1932-1978)
 Anthea Loveday Veronica Mander (1945-2004); married John Lahr in 1965.

References

Sir Geoffrey Le Mesurier Mander (ed), The History of Mander Brothers (Wolverhampton. 1955)
C. Nicholas Mander, Varnished Leaves: a biography of the Mander Family of Wolverhampton, 1750-1950 (Owlpen Press, 2004)
Patricia Pegg, A Very Private Heritage: the private papers of Samuel Theodore Mander, 1853-1900 (Malvern, 1996)
Nicholas Mander, Last of the Midland Radicals; biography of Sir Geoffrey Mander, Liberal MP for Wolverhampton East, 1929-45 in Journal of Liberal History, Issue 53, Winter 2006-07
Geoffrey Mander M.P. "We were not all wrong - How the Labour and Liberal Parties (& also the anti-Munich Tories) strove, pre-war, for the policy of collective security against aggression - with adequate armaments to make that policy effective: the truth about the peace ballot: etc, etc." - (Victor Gollancz Ltd. 1944)

External links 
 
"Sir Geoffrey Mander: the last of the Midland Radicals"

1882 births
1962 deaths
People from Wolverhampton
People educated at Harrow School
Alumni of Trinity College, Cambridge
Mander, Sir Geoffrey
Liberal Party (UK) MPs for English constituencies
English art collectors
People educated at Summer Fields School
UK MPs 1929–1931
UK MPs 1931–1935
UK MPs 1935–1945
Councillors in Staffordshire
Labour Party (UK) councillors
High Sheriffs of Staffordshire
English justices of the peace
Members of the Inner Temple